Oleg Gusev may refer to:

 Oleg Gusev (canoeist)
 Oleh Husiev, Ukrainian football player
 Oleg Andreyevich Gusev, Russian entrepreneur from Urals